Farhad Aghazade (12 August 1880, in Shusha, Russian Empire – 4 January 1931 in Baku, Azerbaijan SSR, USSR) was Azerbaijani teacher, linguist, journalist.

Life 
Farhad Agazade graduated from the Transcaucasian Teachers Seminary  (1900), was engaged in teaching activities in Baku, Shusha, Ganja and Khachmas. For a long time he maintained friendly and creative relations with Uzeyir Hajibeyov. He participated in cultural and educational events of the Baku Muslim Educational Society "Nijat", actively collaborated with Uzeyir Hajibeyov in the newspapers "Hayat", "Irshad", as well as in the preparation of school programs and textbooks. Uzeyir Hajibeyov published in the newspaper "Taraggi" a review of Agazade's textbook "Second Year" (1907), compiled by him together with several teachers. In 1909-1918, Agazadeh, who taught at the "Saadat" school, repeatedly reminded Uzeyir Hajibeyov, who worked with him, of Hasan bey Zardabi's order to create a large-scale musical work. In 1918-1920 he collaborated with Uzeyir Hajibeyov in the newspaper "Azerbaijan". In the memoirs of Agazade's wife Govkhar khanum ("Azerbaijan Gadyns", 1969, No. 2), the family nature of their friendship is emphasized.

Selected works 
 Oчерк по истории развития движения нового алфавита и его достижения
 История возникновения и проникновения в жизнь идеи нового тюркского алфавита в АССР. С 1922 по 1925 год
 Первый Всесоюзный Тюркологический съезд 26 февраля — 5 марта 1926
 Материалы по унификации проектов нового тюркского алфавита

References

Sources 
 
 
 

1880 births
1931 deaths
Azerbaijani educators
Scientists from Shusha
Transcaucasian Teachers Seminary alumni